The Old Tom Morris Award is the Golf Course Superintendents Association of America's most prestigious honor. It is presented each year to an individual who "through a continuing lifetime commitment to the game of golf has helped to mold the welfare of the game in a manner and style exemplified by Old Tom Morris." 

Morris (1821–1908) was greenskeeper and golf professional at the St Andrews Links Trust Golf Club of St. Andrews, Scotland; a four-time winner of The Open Championship (1861, 1862, 1864 and 1867); and ranked as one of the top links designers of the 19th century.

The recipient of this award is determined by the GCSAA Board of Directors. The award is presented annually at the GCSAA Education Conference, held in conjunction with the Golf Industry Show.

Winners

1983 Arnold Palmer
1984 Bob Hope
1985 Gerald Ford
1986 Patty Berg
1987 Robert Trent Jones
1988 Gene Sarazen
1989 Juan "Chi-Chi" Rodríguez
1990 Sherwood A. Moore, CGCS
1991 William C. Campbell
1992 Tom Watson
1993 Dinah Shore
1994 Byron Nelson
1995 James R. Watson, Ph.D.
1996 Tom Fazio
1997 Ben Crenshaw
1998 Ken Venturi
1999 Jaime Ortiz-Patiño
2000 Nancy Lopez
2001 Tim Finchem
2002 Walter Woods, Esq.
2003 Pete Dye
2004 Rees Jones
2005 Jack Nicklaus
2006 Joseph M. Duich, Ph.D.
2007 Charlie Sifford
2008 Greg Norman
2009 Col. John Morley
2010 Judy Rankin
2011 Nick Price
2012 Peter Jacobsen
2013 Michael Hurdzan
2014 Annika Sorenstam
2015 Dan Jenkins
2016 Herb Kohler
2017 Paul R. Latshaw
2018 Ernie Els
2019 Powell family
2020 Gary Player
2021 Jim Nantz
2022 Vince Gill

Source:

References

External links
Official site

Golf awards in the United States
Awards established in 1983
1983 establishments in the United States